NGC 2397 is a flocculent spiral galaxy located in the southern Volans constellation, about one degree to the SSE of Delta Volantis. English astronomer John Herschel discovered the galaxy on February 21, 1835. It is located at a distance of approximately 69 million light years from the Sun, and is a member of the small NGC 2442 group that includes NGC 2434.

The morphological classification of NGC 2397 is SB(s)b, which indicates this is a barred spiral (SB) with no ring structure around the nucleus (s) and moderately tightly–wound spiral arms (b). The nucleus is partly obscured and consists of older yellow and red stars; more recent stars have formed within the outer blue spiral arms, which also feature protrusions of dust.

In March 2006, a star in the galaxy, SN 2006bc, was spotted in the late stages of supernova. Astronomers at Queen's University Belfast, who have been studying supernovas to find out what sort of stars explode, worked through previously captured images of the galaxy and found one of when the star exploded, one of only six ever collected. Early spectra indicated this was a type II supernova, possibly of sub-type II-L or II-P.

References

External links 
 

Barred spiral galaxies
Flocculent spiral galaxies
2397
Volans (constellation)
020766